Albertisiella acanthodiformis is a species of katydid native to the islands of West Nusa Tenggara to Maluku. It is the only species in the genus Albertisiella.

References

Mecopodinae
Insects described in 1898